C. radicans may refer to:
 Campsis radicans, the trumpet vine or trumpet creeper, a plant species
 Cucurbita radicans, the Calabacilla or Calabaza de Coyote, a plant species found growing wild, but also cultivated, in southern Mexico

See also